Dumol may refer to:

Paul Dumol, Philippine playwright and educator
George Jamell (known as George Dumol in French), fictional character from the television series Mona the Vampire

See also
Dumal, a castle
Dumont (disambiguation)